Teshkan Rural District is a rural district (dehestan) in Chegeni District, Dowreh County, Lorestan Province, Iran. At the 2006 census, its population was 10,303, in 2,154 families.  The rural district has 48 villages.

References 

Rural Districts of Lorestan Province
Dowreh County